William Ryder (b Mitchelstown 7 November 1790 – d Queenstown, County Cork 26 May 1862) was Archdeacon of Cloyne from 1834 until his death. 

Ryder was  educated at Trinity College, Dublin and ordained in 1833. He was ordained Deacon on 14 September 1817, and Priest on 11 October 1818. After a curacy at Rathcormack he held incumbencies at  Cork, Gortroe and Queenstiown.
At the Village of Rathcormac in the County of Cork, on 18 December 1834 Archdeacon William Ryder, who was having problems collecting Tithes and as trouble was expected The Archdeacon was accompanied by a force of 100 soldiers.  When faced with the expected civil demonstration by some 250 locals. The Archdeacon ordered the troops to open fire, this they did killing some twenty locals and wounding many.

References

1790 births
1862 deaths
People from County Cork
Alumni of Trinity College Dublin
Archdeacons of Cloyne